Vince Bayou, also known as Vince's Bayou, is a river that rises in southeast Harris County, Texas and runs northwest, through Pasadena and the city of South Houston, for a total of 19 channel miles (which include the reach of one minor tributary) to its mouth on the Houston Ship Channel (the lower reaches of Buffalo Bayou).

Very little wildlife habitat exists, and the estimated population within the Vince Bayou watershed is just under 89,000 persons. Vince Bayou hosts a primarily urban environment.

See also
List of rivers of Texas

References

External links

Rivers of Texas
Rivers of Harris County, Texas